Kajuru Castle is a luxury villa, built between the years 1981 and 1989, at Kajuru (Ajure) village in southern Kaduna State, Nigeria. It was built by a German expatriate in Nigeria, living in Kaduna at the time.

The castle is located at about 45 km from Kaduna on a mountaintop in Kajuru (Ajure) village, Kaduna State. Built with 1 meter thick granite stone in a fanciful medieval-inspired Romanesque style, it is adorned with turrets, an armory and a dungeon.

The castle is privately owned, and has the capacity to host 150 guests.

Architecture

The castle is often described as an African version of the Bavarian Castle in a grand 19th-century Romanesque revival style. It has a baronial styled hall, coupled with dungeons and towers lined with crenellated walls. The castle also has a big “knight’s hall” and a landlord (masters) residence and several other rooms over its three floors.

Incident 
On 19 April 2019, unidentified terrorists armed with heavy weapons broke into the castle, killing two people, a British communication specialist and a Nigerian assistant for NGO company Mercy Corps. The unidentified terrorists also kidnapped three others.

Later on, the kidnapped hostages were released after an intervention by the Nigerian police.

See also 

 List of castles in Africa

References

Residential buildings in Nigeria
Villas
Houses completed in 1989
Buildings and structures in Nigeria
Tourist attractions in Kaduna State
Castles in Nigeria
20th-century architecture in Nigeria